The 2020 KNVB Cup Final was planned to be a football match between Eredivisie clubs FC Utrecht and Feyenoord, that would take place on 19 April 2020 at De Kuip, Rotterdam. It was to be the final match of the 2019–20 KNVB Cup, the 102nd season of the annual Dutch national football cup competition.

The winners of this match would have competed in the 2020 Johan Cruyff Shield and earned a 2020–21 UEFA Europa League group stage berth, assuming they hadn't already qualified for the 2020–21 UEFA Champions League.

On 24 April 2020, the final was cancelled due to the COVID-19 pandemic in the Netherlands.

Route to the final

Match

Details

References

2020
2019–20 in Dutch football
Feyenoord matches
FC Utrecht matches
April 2020 sports events in the Netherlands
Sports competitions in Rotterdam
21st century in Rotterdam
KNVB Cup Final